Scooby's Mystery Funhouse was a 30-minute Saturday morning animated package show produced by Hanna-Barbera Productions and broadcast on ABC from September 7, 1985 to January 25, 1986.

Overview
The series consisted of repackaged reruns of Scooby-Doo and Scrappy-Doo shorts from the following shows:

The Richie Rich/Scooby-Doo Show (1980–81)
The Scooby & Scrappy-Doo/Puppy Hour (1982)
The New Scooby and Scrappy-Doo Show / The New Scooby-Doo Mysteries (1983–84)

A total of 63 shorts were rebroadcast in 21 half-hour formats (three segments aired per show).

Episodes
"From Bad to Curse" / "Scoobygeist" / "Hound of the Scoobyvilles" (September 7, 1985)
 "Close Encounter of the Worst Kind" / "Scooby the Barbarian" / "Where's the Werewolf" (September 14, 1985)
"Captain Canine Caper" / "Scooby of the Jungle" / "Who's Minding the Monster?" (September 21, 1985)
"Scoobsie" / "Scooby-Doo and Genie-Poo" / "The Incredible Cat Lady Caper" (September 28, 1985)
"Basketball Bumblers" / "No Thanks, Masked Manx" / "Wizards and Warlocks" (October 5, 1985)
"Scooby ala Mode" / "Super Teen Shaggy" / "Maltese Mackerel" (October 12, 1985)
"Hoedown Showdown" / "Mission Un-DOO-Able" / "Scooby's Gold Medal Gambit" (October 19, 1985)
"The Hand of Horror" / "Scoo-Be or Not Scoo-Be" / "Who's Scooby-Doo?" (October 26, 1985)
"Double Trouble Date" / "Scooby's Peep-Hole Pandemonium" / "Comic Book Caper" (November 2, 1985)
"A Gem of a Case" / "South Pole Vault" / "The 'Dooby Dooby Doo' Ado" (November 9, 1985)
"Beauty Contest Caper" / "The Fall Dog" / "The Scooby Coupe" (November 16, 1985)
"Scooby and the Minotaur" / "Scooby Pinch Hits" / "Scooby Roo" (November 23, 1985)
"Hothouse Scooby" / "Punk Rock Scooby" / "Scooby 2000" (November 30, 1985)
"Canine to Five" / "Hard Hat Scooby" / "Sopwith Scooby" (December 7, 1985)
"Robot Ranch" / "Scooby Dooby Guru" / "Surprised Spies" (December 14, 1985)
"Pigskin Scooby" / "Scooby and the Beanstalk" / "Tenderbigfoot" (December 21, 1985)
"A Fright at the Opera" / "Invasion of the Scooby Snatchers" / "Scooby and the Bandit" (December 28, 1985)
"Dog Tag Scooby" / "Scooby at the Center of the World" / "Scooby's Trip to Ahz" (January 4, 1986)
"The Dinosaur Deception" / "Scooby of the Jungle" / "The Quagmire Quake Caper" (January 11, 1986)
"No Thanks, Masked Manx" / "The Crazy Carnival Caper" / "The Mark of Scooby" (January 18, 1986)
"No Sharking Zone" / "Scooby-Doo and Cyclops, Too" / "The Creature Came from Chem Lab" (January 25, 1986)

Voices
Don Messick – Scooby-Doo, Scrappy-Doo
Casey Kasem – Shaggy
Heather North – Daphne

See also
 List of Scooby-Doo media

References

External links
 
 Scooby's Mystery Funhouse at The Big Cartoon DataBase

Scooby-Doo package shows and programming blocks
American children's animated mystery television series
1980s American animated television series
1985 American television series debuts
1986 American television series endings
American Broadcasting Company original programming
Television series by Hanna-Barbera
American children's animated adventure television series
American children's animated comedy television series
American children's animated fantasy television series